The Turon du Néouvielle is a summit in the French Pyrenees, culminating at 3,035 m, located in the Néouvielle Range, on the edge of the Pyrenees National Park. It is famous for having the first recorded ascent of a Pyrenees peak over 3,000 metres.

History 
In 1787, on the second of August, Jean-Joseph Vidal, an astronomer from Mirepoix, and the chemist Henri Reboul from Toulouse, who was studying the snowmass in the Pyrenees, made the first recorded ascent. They gave their names to the rocky ridge which extends from the crest of Turon towards Cap-de-Long Lake.

Access 
The peak is easily accessible from Barèges, going past the alpine "hut" of Refuge de la Glère, by Lake Glère.

See also 
 List of Pyrenean three-thousanders

References

External links 
 
 

Mountains of the Pyrenees
Mountains of Hautes-Pyrénées
Landforms of Hautes-Pyrénées
Pyrenean three-thousanders